Deon Kevin Johnson is the eleventh bishop of the Episcopal Diocese of Missouri. He was elected on November 23, 2019, and was consecrated and installed on June 13, 2020. His ordination and consecration was originally scheduled for April 25, 2020, but the coronavirus forced a postponement of the event. He succeeded Wayne Smith as Bishop of Missouri.

A native of Barbados, Johnson emigrated to the United States when he was 14 years old. He studied at Case Western Reserve University and graduated with a Bachelor of Arts in English and History in 2000. He also graduated with a Master of Divinity from the General Theological Seminary in 2003. He was ordained deacon on June 15, 2003, and priest on December 19, 2003. After ordination, he served as associate rector at Christ Church in Shaker Heights, Ohio, until 2006, when he became rector at St Paul's Church in Brighton, Michigan. From 2012, he also later served as a consultant at the Office of Black Ministries.

On November 23, 2019, Johnson was elected to the post of Bishop of Missouri, having been elected on the first ballot. He received a majority of the clergy and lay votes in the election. Johnson is the first black gay bishop in The Episcopal Church.

See also
 List of Episcopal bishops of the United States
 List of bishops of the Episcopal Church in the United States of America

References

External links
 Deon Johnson elected 11th Bishop of Missouri

Episcopal bishops of Missouri
Barbadian LGBT people
LGBT Anglican bishops
Living people
Year of birth missing (living people)
Barbadian emigrants to the United States
African-American Episcopalians
LGBT African Americans
21st-century LGBT people